The Shark 24 is a Canadian-designed 24 ft sailing yacht which has earned itself a reputation of extraordinary reliability and longevity among sailors both in North America and Central Europe. Having been designed by George Hinterhoeller back in 1959 to cope well even with the harshest conditions found in the Great Lakes region, the vessel has proven to be well suited for extended leisure trips as well as for tough racing.

The Shark 24 was awarded International status by World Sailing in 2000.

History
George Hinterhoeller grew up in Austria where he sailed the light displacement fin keel sailboats that were common there. By 1959 he had emigrated to Canada and was working for a boat builder in Niagara-on-the-Lake, Ontario. Hinterhoeller decided to design and build a sailboat for himself that was similar to what he had sailed in his youth in Austria. The result was a  plywood boat he named Teeter Totter. Other sailors saw the resulting boat, and how fast it sailed compared to the heavy displacement boats common on the Great Lakes at the time and asked Hinterhoeller to build similar boats for them. The customer who commissioned the fifth hull requested it be built in fibreglass and offered to help Hinterhoeller build it using this new material. The resulting boat was a success and all subsequent Shark produced were built in fibreglass as this resulted in a lighter boat that took far less time to build so was less expensive and required much less ongoing maintenance.

Design
The shark is a light displacement cruising and racing sailboat. It has a 7/8 fractional sloop rig, a small cabin and a self-bailing cockpit.  The iron fin keel, combined with a transom hung spade rudder, and a flat run aft allows the hull to ride up on its bow wave and plane under the right conditions, giving the Shark more speed than a displacement hull of the same waterline length. It had a displacement-length ratio of 123, extraordinarily low for its time.

The Shark has a V-berth, two quarter berths, and a small galley with sink, stove and icebox. It has sitting headroom under the small deckhouse.

Events

World Championship
A World Championship Regatta for the Shark 24 class has been continuously contested for over 50 years. The regatta follows a three-year rotation where for two consecutive years the regatta is hosted by the Canadian Shark Class Association in Canada, and the third year it is held in Europe in Austria, Germany, or Switzerland.

See also

List of sailing boat types
Similar sailboats
Achilles 24
C&C 24
Challenger 24
Columbia 24
Dana 24
Islander 24
Islander 24 Bahama
J/24
MacGregor 24
Mirage 24
Nutmeg 24
San Juan 24
Seidelmann 245
Tonic 23

References

External links

Sailing yachts
Sailing in Canada
1950s sailboat type designs
Classes of World Sailing
Sailboat type designs by George Hinterhoeller
Sailboat types built by Hinterhoeller Yachts
Sailboat types built by C&C Yachts
One-design sailing classes